Formula One (F1) is the highest class of open-wheeled auto racing defined by the Fédération Internationale de l'Automobile (FIA), motorsport's world governing body. The "formula" in the name refers to a set of rules to which all participants and vehicles must conform. The results of each race are combined to determine two annual Championships, one for drivers and one for constructors.

It was not until the 1960s these were first introduced, as helmets and overalls became mandatory and the FIA assumed responsibility for safety at the circuits. Steps were taken to improve the safety of the Formula One car in the 1970s; the cockpit opening was enlarged allowing the driver to escape more quickly in the event of an accident and outside mirrors became mandatory. The 1980s saw further improvement in the structure of the Formula One car, with the monocoque being made out of carbon fibre instead of aluminium, increasing protection upon impact. Grooved tyres were introduced in  instead of racing slick tyres to reduce cornering speed. Safety measures continued to be introduced into the 21st century, with a number of circuits having their configuration changed to improve driver safety.

This list includes drivers who have died during a FIA World Championship event (including practice, qualifying and the race), and those who have died while driving modern or vintage Formula One cars outside the World Championship. Track marshals and other race attendees who have died as a result of these accidents are not included in the list. Thirty-two of the drivers died from incidents during Grand Prix race weekends which formed part of the World Championship, seven during test sessions and twelve during non-championship Formula One events. The Indianapolis Motor Speedway has seen the most fatalities; seven drivers have died there during the time that the Indianapolis 500 formed part of the world championship. Fifteen drivers died in the 1950s; fourteen in the 1960s; twelve in the 1970s; four in the 1980s and two in the 1990s. Three drivers died in the intervening years while driving former Formula One cars (two from the 1960s, one from the 1990s) in vintage racing and other events not associated with World Championship . Rindt is the only driver to have won the championship posthumously.

Fatalities

By nationality

By circuit

By decade

Notes

References

External links 
 Formula One official website
 FIA official website

Fatal accidents
Formula One